This is a list of casinos in Michigan. Gambling has been legal in Michigan since the 1980s. The state is home to 26 land-based casinos. 23 of these are Indian casinos and 3 are commercial casinos in Detroit

Online casinos 
As well as legal land-based gambling, those living in or visiting Michigan can now sign up and play at online casinos. On December 20th, 2019, Governor Gretchen Whitmer signed Bill 4311 and legalized online gambling within state lines. The Michigan Gaming Control Board was then formed, and in late 2020 the MGCB issued licenses, giving online casinos the go-ahead to launch at the state of 2021.

List of casinos

</onlyinclude>
</onlyinclude>

Gallery

See also

List of casinos in the United States 
List of casino hotels
 Michigan Gaming Control Board

References

External links

 Michigan Casinos, Pure Michigan (official state tourism website), 2012

 
Michigan
Casinos